The Ontario Sire Stakes is a category of Canadian Thoroughbred and Standardbred horse race. For Thoroughbred horse races, the race is restricted to horses of either sex sired by a stallion standing in the Province of Ontario for his entire season the year of conception and registered with the Canadian Thoroughbred Horse Society for that season.

For the Ontario Standardbred Sires Stakes program, the foal's stallion must be registered with the Ontario Sires Stakes program. To be eligible to the program, the stallion must be owned by an Ontario resident or leased to an Ontario resident.

Ontario Sire Stakes Thoroughbred races include the:
Bull Page Stakes
Bunty Lawless Stakes
Deputy Minister Stakes
Kingarvie Stakes
La Prevoyante Stakes
New Providence Stakes
Shepperton Stakes
Overskate Stakes
Sir Barton Stakes
Vice Regent Stakes 
Victoriana Stakes

References

External links
 Woodbine Entertainment
 The Jockey Club of Canada's A Guide To Thoroughbred Ownership in Canada (PDF)

 
Horse races in Canada
Sport in Ontario